Karang language (also called Mbum East or Lakka) is an Mbum language of Cameroon and Chad.

Dialects
There are 27,000 – 32,000 Karang speakers in Cameroon, including 7,000 speakers of the Sakpu dialect (SIL 1991), and 10,000-15,000 speakers of the Nzakmbay dialect (SIL 1998). Karang is spoken in Touboro and Tcholliré communes in Mayo-Rey department, Northern Region, and also in Chad. It is closely related to Pana.

Writing system

Nasalisation is indicated with a cedilla : a̧, ȩ, i̧, o̧, ɔ̧, u̧.

The only tone is high, indicated with an acute accent: á, é, í, ó, ɔ́, ú; it can be combined with nasalisation: á̧, ȩ́, í̧, ó̧, ú̧.

Long vowels are indicated with an h.

See also
List of Proto-Lakka reconstructions (Wiktionary)

References

Roger Blench, 2004. List of Adamawa languages (ms)

Languages of Cameroon
Languages of Chad
Mbum languages